Sidney Richard Yates (August 27, 1909 – October 5, 2000) was an American politician from the state of Illinois. A native of Chicago, he graduated from Lake View High School in 1928. He received bachelor's (1931) and law (1933) degrees from the University of Chicago, was admitted to the bar, and practiced law in Chicago. In addition to working as an attorney, Yates also played semiprofessional basketball in the 1930s. He gained his initial experience in government as an attorney for the state bank receiver (1935-1937), and an assistant state attorney general specializing in traction railroads for the Illinois Commerce Commission (1937-1940). During World War II, Yates served in the United States Navy for two years (1944-1946) as an attorney based in Washington, D.C.

In 1948, Yates was elected to Congress, and he served from 1949 to 1963. After an unsuccessful run against Everett Dirksen for the United States Senate in 1962, in 1964 Yates was again elected to the House. He served from 1965 to 1999, and did not run for reelection in 1998. He was a longtime member of the House Appropriations Committee, where he became known for staunch U.S. support of Israel, and federal funding for parks, historical conservation, and the arts. Yates was also an advocate for several liberal causes, including opposition to discrimination based on age. At the time he concluded his service, he was third oldest person to ever serve in the House (age 89) behind Charles Manly Stedman and Isaac R. Sherwood, and one of the longest-tenured members in the history of Congress (total House service of 48 years).

Yates died in Washington in 2000. He was buried at Memorial Park Cemetery in Skokie, Illinois.

Early life
Yates was born in Chicago, Illinois, the youngest of six children of Lithuanian Jewish immigrants Louis and Ida Yates. He grew up in Chicago and was an office boy at Variety Chicago office during the 1920s. He graduated from the University of Chicago in 1931 with a Bachelor of Philosophy degree and received a Juris Doctor from the University of Chicago Law School in 1933. While in college, Yates joined the Pi Lambda Phi fraternity. He also played basketball, and was selected for All Big Ten honors. In the mid-1930s, he played semiprofessional basketball and practiced law. Yates was an attorney for the Illinois state bank receiver from 1935 to 1937. From 1937 to 1940 he was an assistant state attorney general attached to the Illinois Commerce Commission as a traction attorney. He served in the United States Navy during World War II, assigned as an attorney for the Bureau of Ships in Washington, DC.

Career in Congress
From 1949 to 1963 and 1965 to 1999, Yates served in the House of Representatives as a Democrat. Although the boundaries of his district changed over the years, it was always anchored in the Chicago lakefront. From the 1970s onward, Chicago's declining population resulted in the district spilling into the northern suburbs. By the time he retired, his district also included Evanston, Des Plaines, Glenview, Rosemont and Skokie.

Yates was one of the first congressmen to speak out against age discrimination, arguing in 1951 that mandatory retirement of workers was wrong and deprived older people of their right to lead a proud, productive and independent life.

During the late 1950s, after a series of lurid magazine articles and Hollywood films helped to sensationalize youth gangs and violence, Yates called for legislation to ban automatic-opening or switchblade knives, melodramatically proclaiming that "Vicious fantasies of omnipotence, idolatry...barbaric and sadistic atrocities, and monstrous violations of accepted values spring from the cult of the weapon, and the switchblade knife is included in this. Minus switchblade knives and the distorted feeling of power they beget—power that is swaggering, reckless, and itching to express itself in violence—our delinquent adolescents would be shorn of one of their most potent means of incitement to crime." The ban on switchblade knives was eventually enacted into law as the Switchblade Knife Act of 1958. Rep. Yates and other congressmen supporting the Switchblade Knife Act believed that by stopping the importation and interstate sales of automatic knives (effectively halting sales of new switchblades), the law would reduce youth gang violence by blocking access to what had become a symbolic weapon. However, while switchblade imports, domestic production, and sales to lawful owners soon ended, later legislative research demonstrated that youth gang violence rates had in fact rapidly increased, as gang members began using firearms instead of knives.

Yates was an unsuccessful candidate for the United States Senate in 1962 against Republican incumbent and Senate Minority Leader Everett Dirksen. He briefly served at the United Nations before returning to the House after the 1964 election. Fellow Democrat Edward Finnegan won Yates' old seat after his former district was merged with the 9th, but Chicago machine bosses persuaded him to accept a circuit judgeship in return for letting Yates take his old seat back. Yates served on the Appropriations Committee throughout his career and chaired the Interior Subcommittee from 1975 to 1995. On this committee he supported environmental programs and the National Endowment for the Arts.

Yates remained on good terms with both liberal reformers and machine politicians in Chicago throughout his career. He also served on the Foreign Operations subcommittee and was a strong advocate of American support for Israel. He worked hand-in-hand with his chief of staff, Mary Bain, to preserve federal funding for the arts and for Natural Heritage Preservation programs, and to establish the U.S. Holocaust Memorial Museum.

In 1993, he was presented with the Presidential Citizens Medal by President Clinton and in 1997 he received the Four Freedoms Award for Freedom of Speech In 1999, the Auditors Building in Washington, DC, was renamed the Sidney Yates Building in his honor.

He is the longest-serving member ever of the United States House of Representatives from the state of Illinois. He holds the record as the 10th longest-serving member in the history of the US Congress, and also has the longest tenure of all members whose time in Congress included a break in service.

Death and burial
Yates died in Washington, D.C., on October 5, 2000. He was buried at Memorial Park Cemetery in Skokie, Illinois.

Family
Yates was married to Adeline Holleb (1914–2002) for 65 years.  They were the parents of Stephen R. Yates (1940-2000), who served as an Illinois circuit court judge.

His brother Charles was a talent agent for Bob Hope, Bing Crosby and Martha Raye.

See also
List of Jewish members of the United States Congress

Notes

References

External links

 

1909 births
2000 deaths
20th-century American politicians
Jewish American military personnel
United States Navy personnel of World War II
American people of Lithuanian-Jewish descent
Democratic Party members of the United States House of Representatives from Illinois
Jewish members of the United States House of Representatives
Illinois lawyers
Politicians from Chicago
Presidential Citizens Medal recipients
University of Chicago alumni
Variety (magazine) people
20th-century American lawyers
20th-century American Jews